Harry Marshall "Swede" Roos Sr. (August 8, 1913 – January 30, 1979) was an American professional basketball player. He played for the Chicago American Gears in the National Basketball League, among other teams and leagues.

Roos also served as the head coach for the Chicago American Gears in 1945–46 and as an assistant in 1946–47. He then became a player-coach in the Professional Basketball League of America for his final two seasons (1946 through 1948).

References

1913 births
1979 deaths
Amateur Athletic Union men's basketball players
American men's basketball players
Basketball coaches from Illinois
Basketball players from Chicago
Chicago American Gears coaches
Chicago American Gears players
Forwards (basketball)
Guards (basketball)
Player-coaches
Professional Basketball League of America coaches
Professional Basketball League of America players
Sportspeople from Chicago